Sir Robert "Robin" Chichester-Clark (10 January 1928 – 5 August 2016) was Member of Parliament for Londonderry in the British House of Commons from 1955 until February 1974, and to date was the last member representing a seat in Northern Ireland to be a British government minister.

Early life
Chichester-Clark was born at Moyola Park, Castledawson, County Londonderry, his family's ancestral home. He was the eldest of three children of James J. Lenox-Conyngham Clark and Marion Caroline Dehra, née Chichester. His brother was James Chichester-Clark, who was Prime Minister of Northern Ireland from 1969 to 1971, and his sister was Penelope Hobhouse, the garden writer and historian. In 1924 James Clark, Snr. changed the family name to Chichester-Clark by deed poll, thus preventing the old ascendancy name Chichester (his wife's maiden name) from dying out. On his mother's side the family are descended from the Donegall Chichesters and were the heirs of the Dawsons of Castledawson, who had originally held Moyola Park.

He was educated at the Royal Naval College, Dartmouth and Magdalene College, Cambridge. He began work as a journalist in 1949, worked as public relations officer for Glyndebourne 1952–3, before joining the publishing house Oxford University Press.

Political life
Chichester-Clark was elected for Londonderry at the 1955 general election. He was the third generation of politicians from his family. His grandfather, Robert Chichester, represented South Londonderry at the Imperial Parliament at Westminster; his grandmother, Dame Dehra Parker, and father were both members of the Parliament of Northern Ireland. His brother, Major James Chichester-Clark, was Prime Minister of Northern Ireland from 1969 to 1971, but resigned in the face of increasing violence and internal Ulster Unionist Party splits. The family were also active in politics in the 19th century and Chichester-Clark's great-great-grandfather, The Rt. Hon. George Robert Dawson, was Member of Parliament for Londonderry, later for an English constituency, before joining the government of Sir Robert Peel, whose sister Mary he married. They lived at Castledawson.

Chichester-Clark was consistently either a Front Bench Spokesman for the Opposition or a member of the Government of Harold Macmillan and, later, Edward Heath. He held the position of Assistant Government Whip, Lord Commissioner of the Treasury, Comptroller of the Household, was Conservative Spokesman for Northern Ireland and on the Arts, Shadow Minister of Public Building and Works and, ultimately, Minister of State for Employment. In 1970 he remained outside the UK government because of the Premiership of his brother in Northern Ireland. When Edward Heath suspended the Stormont Government and Parliament in 1972, he asked Chichester-Clark to go with William Whitelaw to Northern Ireland as Minister of State. Chichester-Clark did not accept but later joined the administration as Minister of State for Employment. Before the February 1974 election he announced his retirement from the Londonderry constituency and did not put himself forward for reselection.

Later life
From 1974 he worked as a director of companies in the construction industry, as a political adviser to the NFBTE, as a management consultant and as Chairman of the medical research charity RAFT (www.raft.ac.uk) and The Arvon Foundation. He also helped with fundraising for the Royal Philharmonic Orchestra and with the development of the Museum of Illustration. Chichester-Clark was interviewed in 2012 and 2014 as part of The History of Parliament's oral history project.

Personal life
He was first married to Jane Helen Goddard, daughter of Air Marshall Sir Robert Victor Goddard, KCB, CB. With Jane Goddard he had three children, Emma, Mark and Sophia. His second wife was the barrister Caroline Bull, daughter of the transport executive Anthony Bull. The couple had two sons; Adam and Thomas. Chichester-Clark's sister, Penelope Hobhouse, is a gardener, gardening writer and historian.

Ancestors

References

Further reading

External links
 Robin Chichester-Clark interview at History of Parliament Online
The Papers of Sir Robin Chichester-Clark held at Churchill Archives Centre, Cambridge

1928 births
2016 deaths
Members of the Parliament of the United Kingdom for County Londonderry constituencies (since 1922)
Ulster Unionist Party members of the House of Commons of the United Kingdom
Alumni of Magdalene College, Cambridge
UK MPs 1955–1959
UK MPs 1959–1964
UK MPs 1964–1966
UK MPs 1966–1970
UK MPs 1970–1974
People from County Londonderry
Robin
Ministers in the Macmillan and Douglas-Home governments, 1957–1964